Madagascar is an island country in the Indian Ocean, off the coast of Southeast Africa. Madagascar belongs to the group of least developed countries, according to the United Nations. Ecotourism and agriculture, paired with greater investments in education, health, and private enterprise, are key elements of Madagascar's development strategy. Under Marc Ravalomanana, these investments produced substantial economic growth, but the benefits were not evenly spread throughout the population, producing tensions over the increasing cost of living and declining living standards among the poor and some segments of the middle class. , the economy has been weakened by the 2009-2013 political crisis, and quality of life remains low for the majority of the Malagasy population.

Notable firms 
This list includes notable companies with primary headquarters located in the country. The industry and sector follow the Industry Classification Benchmark taxonomy. Organizations which have ceased operations are included and noted as defunct.

See also

References 

 
Madagascar